The House of Stairs is a 1988 novel by British writer Ruth Rendell, published under the name Barbara Vine. Writing in The Washington Post, Michael Dirda referred to the novel as a "stunning suspense [thriller]".

References

1988 British novels
Novels by Ruth Rendell
Works published under a pseudonym
Viking Press books
Harmony Books books